Bicknell is a surname. Notable people with the surname include:

Andrew Bicknell, (born 1956), English actor
Bennet Bicknell, (1781-1841), US Representative
Clarence Bicknell, (1842-1918), British pastor, botanist and esperantist
Darren Bicknell, (born 1967), English cricketer
Ed Bicknell, (born 1948), English businessman
Elhanan Bicknell (1788–1861), British businessman and patron of the arts
Eugene Pintard Bicknell (1859-1925), American botanist and ornithologist
Francis Bicknell Carpenter, (1830-1900), American painter
George A. Bicknell, (1815-1891), US Representative
Greg Bicknell, American baseball player
Herman Bicknell, (1830-1875), Orientalist and linguist
Jack Bicknell, (born 1938), American football coach
John Bicknell Auden, (1903-1931), English geologist
John Dustin Bicknell, (1838-1911), Los Angeles lawyer
Martin Bicknell, (born 1969), English cricketer
Stephen Bicknell, (1957-2007), English organ builder
Steve Bicknell, (born 1959), English footballer
Thomas W. Bicknell, (1834-1925), American author